The Facemaker is a 1967 novel by the British writer Richard Gordon. It follows the career of Graham Trevose, a pioneering plastic surgeon working in the wake of the First World War on battle casualties. It was a more serious book in contrast to the comic Doctor series for which Gordon was better known. It was followed by a sequel Surgeon at Arms in 1968.

References

Bibliography
 Peacock, Scott. Contemporary Authors. Cengage Gale, 2002.

1967 British novels
Novels by Richard Gordon
Medical novels
Heinemann (publisher) books